The Happy House is a 2013 American comedy horror film written and directed by D. W. Young and starring Khan Baykal, Aya Cash, Marceline Hugot, Kathleen McNenny, Oliver Henzler, Mike Houston and Charles Borland.

Cast
Khan Baykal as Joe
Aya Cash as Wendy
Marceline Hugot as Hildie
Kathleen McNenny as Linda
Oliver Henzler as Hverven
Mike Houston as Skip
Charles Borland as Desmond
Stivi Paskoski as Ronnie
Curtis Shumaker as Deputy Marvin

Release
The film premiered in Cinema Village on May 3, 2013.

Reception
The film has a 60 percent rating on Rotten Tomatoes based on five reviews.

Chuck Bowen of Slant Magazine awarded the film two and a half stars out of four and wrote "D.W. Young navigates his varying moods with an ease that’s particularly impressive for a director making his feature debut, but he never capitalizes on his ability to coax down our guard."

The Hollywood Reporter gave the film a negative review: "Neither funny nor scary, this horror spoof mainly just coasts along."

References

External links
 
 

2013 films
American comedy horror films
2010s English-language films
2010s American films